MusicNL (also spelled Music NL, previously known as the Music Industry Association of Newfoundland and Labrador, abbreviated MIANL) is a trade association for the music industry for the Canadian province of Newfoundland and Labrador. Kevin Kelly, a former MusicNL board member, was named Media Person of the Year by the organization several times. The 2006 MusicNL awards were presented in Stephenville. Danny Williams, the province's premier, presented the Lifetime Achievement Award at the 2007 MusicNL awards gala. In 2008, the MusicNL awards gala was held in Gander. 

In 2011, the MusicNL awards were announced in St. John's between October 24 and 30. East of Empire was nominated for three awards, but didn't win either of them. At the 2012 gala, indie pop quartet Repartee won the awards in all five of the categories for which it was nominated. Tom Power, a CBC Radio host, introduced Repartee at the gala.

References

Music industry associations
Music organizations based in Canada
Organizations based in Newfoundland and Labrador
Newfoundland and Labrador awards
Music festivals in Newfoundland and Labrador